Olayiwola Kehinde "Kenny" Onatolu (born October 8, 1982) is a former American football linebacker who played in the Canadian Football League and National Football League. He was signed by the Edmonton Eskimos as an undrafted free agent in 2007. He played college football at Nebraska-Omaha.

Onatolu also played for the Minnesota Vikings and Carolina Panthers.

Personal life
Onatolu earned a bachelor's degree in communications at the University of Nebraska-Omaha, and aspires to have a career in broadcasting. He has an identical twin brother named Taiwo, who was his teammate at Nebraska-Omaha and now is a graduate assistant on the Mavericks’ staff. Onatolu was born in Chicago, but spent 3 years as a child in his parents' home country of Nigeria. His father is a business professor.

College
Kenny earned Division II All-America honors as a junior and senior by Collegesportsreport.com, and recorded 324 career total tackles in his collegiate career, 5th in school history. He was named All-North Central Conference after each of his 4 seasons (2nd team his sophomore year), and captured team’s Outstanding LB award in 2005 and Defensive MVP award in 2006. Kenny was also a member of the Super 6 comedy team.

Professional career

Edmonton Eskimos
After going undrafted in 2007, Onatolu attended an Edmonton Eskimos minicamp after his twin brother Taiwo had a similar experience. He was invited to training camp and eventually made the team.

During his rookie season in the CFL, Onatolu recorded eight tackles and a sack. The following season in 2008, he recorded 59 tackles, three sacks and two fumble recoveries.

Minnesota Vikings
Onatolu was signed to a future contract by the Minnesota Vikings on December 31, 2008. He made the team as a backup linebacker and was one of the leaders on special teams for the Vikings.

Carolina Panthers
Onatolu was signed to a three-year contract by the Carolina Panthers on March 16, 2012. After playing in just four games in the 2012 season, Onatolu was released by the Panthers on April 16, 2013.

References

External links

1982 births
Living people
Players of American football from Chicago
Players of Canadian football from Chicago
American players of Canadian football
American football linebackers
Canadian football linebackers
Nebraska–Omaha Mavericks football players
Edmonton Elks players
Minnesota Vikings players
Carolina Panthers players
American sportspeople of Nigerian descent
American people of Yoruba descent
Yoruba sportspeople
Identical twins
American twins
Twin sportspeople
People from Papillion, Nebraska
Players of American football from Nebraska